Marwan Pablo (born Marwan Ahmed Motawea ), previously known as Dama, is an Egyptian hip-hop artist from Alexandria. He was influenced by the genre of  Mahraganat. He is known for Free, Ghaba, El Gemeza, Sindbad, and Barbary.

Career
Marwan Pablo started making music in 2015, known as Dama at the time. In late 2017, he released a single, Al Gholaf X Ozoris, under the name of Marwan Pablo in reference to Pablo Escobar and Pablo Picasso as he mentions in a single, Free. Pablo began his career writing lyrics and then produced tracks as well.

Marwan Pablo wanted to popularize trap music in his hometown of Alexandria. In 2018, Pablo starred in the Rabka documentary and released Sindbad, Abu Meca and Folklor in collaboration with the Egyptian producer Molotof.

Hiatus
On February 14, 2020, Pablo announced that, for personal and religious reasons, he will no longer be making music. Shortly after, he blanked his YouTube channel and Instagram account. He said the main reason he retired is "the pressure that was forced on him, the different levels of expectations that people have cornered him within, and the constant labeling". He said that he needed a break to "recharge himself without being cornered". On March 9, 2020, Pablo went on Instagram in response to rumors of his illness or death. He was angry over the anecdotes and denied any relation between the retirement and his health or family members.

His Denamet (with Molotof) was the runner-up in Egypt's top 5 list in July 2020.

Return
In January 2021, Pablo was speculated to return after his profile picture on Facebook was changed. He did not confirm his return.

On 19 February, a leaked video on Twitter showcased Pablo working on a new song, preparing for his return, went viral. His name topped the trending list on Twitter that day in Egypt.

On 25 February, Pablo released a single, Ghaba, and reactivated his social media accounts. Pablo's comeback music video gained more than 4 million views on YouTube within the first 24 hours and was on the platform's top 10 trending.

On 29 March, he announced an album named CTRL containing 5 singles Ghaba, El Hob Fein, CTRL, DON, and Atary which was a previously released unfinished song before Pablo's retirement.

On 1 October, Pablo held a concert in New Cairo, accompanied by Palestinian rap group BLTNM members Shabjdeed, Al Nather and Shabmouri. The tickets were sold out and the concert was attended by over 20 thousand people. Shortly after the concert, the Egyptian Musicians' Syndicate banned Pablo from performing because of Shabjdeed's actions during the concert, which included changing the lyrics of a religious chant by Sayed Al Naqshabandi to welcome Pablo on stage, as well as performing songs with obscene lyrics.

References

Living people
Egyptian rappers
Egyptian electronic musicians
Egyptian singer-songwriters
Hip hop singers
21st-century Egyptian male singers
Year of birth missing (living people)